The 2005 Oklahoma State Cowboys football team represented Oklahoma State University during the 2005 NCAA Division I-A football season. They participated as members of the Big 12 Conference in the South Division. They played their home games at Boone Pickens Stadium in Stillwater, Oklahoma. They were coached by head coach Mike Gundy.

Schedule

References

Oklahoma State
Oklahoma State Cowboys football seasons
Oklahoma State Cowboys football